Edgcumbe may refer to:

People 
 Ernest Edgcumbe, 3rd Earl of Mount Edgcumbe (1797–1861), British peer and politician
 George Edgcumbe, 1st Earl of Mount Edgcumbe (1720–1795), British peer, naval officer and politician
 Gerald Edgcumbe Hadow OBE (1911–1978), English Christian missionary to East Africa in the mid-twentieth century
 Peter Edgcumbe (1499–1562), English politician
 Robert Edgcumbe, 8th Earl of Mount Edgcumbe (born 1939), 8th Earl of Mount Edgcumbe
 Rose Edgcumbe (1934–2001), British psychologist and psychoanalyst
 Richard Edgcumbe (disambiguation)
 William Edgcumbe, Viscount Valletort (1794–1818), British politician
 William Edgcumbe, 4th Earl of Mount Edgcumbe (1833–1917), British courtier and Conservative politician

Places 
 Edgcumbe, Cornwall, a settlement
 Mount Edgcumbe Country Park, one of four designated Country Parks in Cornwall
 Mount Edgcumbe House, a stately home in south-east Cornwall

Other 
 Earl of Mount Edgcumbe, a title in the Peerage of Great Britain
 GWR 4073 Class 5043 Earl of Mount Edgcumbe, a locomotive originally built as Banbury Castle in March 1936

See also
 Edgecomb (disambiguation)
 Edgecumbe (disambiguation)
 Mount Edgcumbe (disambiguation)